Jonas Andersson (born 1 January 1977) is a Swedish rally co-driver. Currently, he is the co-driver of Gus Greensmith.

Rally career
Jonas Andersson began his rally career in 2002, co-driving for Per-Gunnar Andersson. In the 2002 Rally Sweden, he made his WRC debut in a Renault Clio RS.

From 2009, he started to partner with the Norwegian rally driver Mads Østberg. In the 2011 Rally Sweden, they achieved their first podium finish. One year later, in Portugal, the crew won their first and only WRC victory after Mikko Hirvonen's disqualification.

Starting from 2017, Andersson began to cooperate with Pontus Tidemand. They won the 2017 WRC-2 title at Škoda Motorsport in a Škoda Fabia R5.

The 2022 season saw Andersson moved to M-Sport, co-driving for Gus Greensmith on a full-season basis.

WRC victories

Rally results

WRC results

* Season still in progress.

WRC-2 Results

* Season still in progress.

References

External links

 Jonas Andersson's e-wrc profile

1977 births
Living people
Swedish rally co-drivers
World Rally Championship co-drivers